Piletocera torsicostalis is a moth in the family Crambidae. It was described by George Hampson in 1897. It is found on Ambon Island in Indonesia.

References

T
Endemic fauna of Indonesia
Moths of Indonesia
Fauna of the Lesser Sunda Islands
Moths described in 1897